Krishan Kumar Kaushal was an Indian politician and leader of Communist Party of India from Himachal Pradesh. He represented Kotkehloor constituency from 1990 to 1993.

References

Communist Party of India politicians from Himachal Pradesh